A cairn is a man-made pile (or stack) of stones raised for a purpose, usually as a marker or as a burial mound.

Cairns have been and are used for a broad variety of purposes. In prehistoric times, they were raised as markers, as memorials and as burial monuments (some of which contained chambers). 
In modern times, cairns are often raised as landmarks, especially to mark the summits of mountains. Cairns are also used as trail markers. They vary in size from small stone markers to entire artificial hills, and in complexity from loose conical rock piles to elaborate megalithic structures. Cairns may be painted or otherwise decorated, whether for increased visibility or for religious reasons.

A variant is the inuksuk (plural inuksuit), used by the Inuit and other peoples of the Arctic region of North America.

History

Europe

The building of cairns for various purposes goes back into prehistory in Eurasia, ranging in size from small rock sculptures to substantial man-made hills of stone (some built on top of larger, natural hills). The latter are often relatively massive Bronze Age or earlier structures which, like kistvaens and dolmens, frequently contain burials; they are comparable to tumuli (kurgans), but of stone construction instead of earthworks. Cairn originally could more broadly refer to various types of hills and natural stone piles, but today is used exclusively of artificial ones.

Britain and Ireland 

Cornwall itself may actually be named after the cairns that dot its landscape, such as Cornwall's highest point, Brown Willy Summit Cairn, a 5 m (16 ft) high and 24 m (79 ft) diameter mound atop Brown Willy hill in Bodmin Moor, an area with many ancient cairns. Burial cairns and other megaliths are the subject of a variety of legends and folklore throughout Britain and Ireland. In Scotland, it is traditional to carry a stone up from the bottom of a hill to place on a cairn at its top. In such a fashion, cairns would grow ever larger. In Highland folklore it is recounted that before Highland clans fought in a battle, each man would place a stone in a pile. Those who survived the battle returned and removed a stone from the pile. The stones that remained were built into a cairn to honour the dead. Cairns in the region were also put to vital practical use. For example, Dún Aonghasa, an all-stone Iron Age Irish hill fort on Inishmore in the Aran Islands, is still surrounded by small cairns and strategically placed jutting rocks, used collectively as an alternative to defensive earthworks because of the karst landscape's lack of soil. In February 2020, ancient cairns dated back to 4,500 year-old used to bury the leaders or chieftains of neolithic tribes people were revealed in the Cwmcelyn in Blaenau Gwent by the Aberystruth Archaeological Society.

Scandinavia and Iceland 
In Scandinavia, cairns have been used for centuries as trail and sea marks, among other purposes. In Iceland, cairns were often used as markers along the numerous single-file roads or paths that crisscrossed the island; many of these ancient cairns are still standing, although the paths have disappeared. In Norse Greenland, cairns were used as a hunting implement, a game-driving "lane", used to direct reindeer towards a game jump.

Greece and the Balkans 
In the mythology of ancient Greece, cairns were associated with Hermes, the god of overland travel. According to one legend, Hermes was put on trial by Hera for slaying her favorite servant, the monster Argus. All of the other gods acted as a jury, and as a way of declaring their verdict they were given pebbles, and told to throw them at whichever person they deemed to be in the right, Hermes or Hera. Hermes argued so skillfully that he ended up buried under a heap of pebbles, and this was the first cairn.
In Croatia, in areas of ancient Dalmatia, such as Herzegovina and the Krajina, they are known as gromila.

Portugal 
In a legend the moledros are enchanted soldiers, and if one stone is taken from the pile and put under a pillow, in the morning a soldier will appear for a brief moment, then will change back to a stone and magically return to the pile. The cairns that mark the place where someone died or cover the graves alongside the roads where in the past people were buried are called . The same name given to the stones was given to the dead whose identity was unknown.

North and northeast Africa

Cairns (taalo) are a common feature at El Ayo, Haylan, Qa’ableh, Qombo'ul, Heis, Salweyn and Gelweita, among other places. Somaliland in general is home to a lot of such historical settlements and archaeological sites wherein are found numerous ancient ruins and buildings, many of obscure origins. However, many of these old structures have yet to be properly explored, a process which would help shed further light on local history and facilitate their preservation for posterity.

Since Neolithic times, the climate of North Africa has become drier. A reminder of the desertification of the area is provided by megalithic remains, which occur in a great variety of forms and in vast numbers in presently arid and uninhabitable wastelands: cairns (kerkour), dolmens and circles like Stonehenge, underground cells excavated in rock, barrows topped with huge slabs, and step pyramid-like mounds.

Middle East

The Biblical place name Gilead (Genesis 31 etc.) means literally "heap of testimony/evidence" as does its Aramaic translation (ibid.) Yegar Sahaduta. In modern Hebrew, gal-'ed (גל-עד) is the actual word for "cairn". In Genesis 31 the cairn of Gilead was set up as a border demarcation between Jacob and his father-in-law Laban at their last meeting.

Asia and the Pacific

Starting in the Bronze Age, burial cists were sometimes interred into cairns, which would be situated in conspicuous positions, often on the skyline above the village of the deceased. Though most often found in the British Isles, evidence of Bronze Age cists have been found in Mongolia. The stones may have been thought to deter grave robbers and scavengers. Another explanation is that they were to stop the dead from rising. There remains a Jewish tradition of placing small stones on a person's grave as a token of respect, known as visitation stones, though this is generally to relate the longevity of stone to the eternal nature of the soul and is not usually done in a cairn fashion. Stupas in India and Tibet probably started out in a similar fashion, although they now generally contain the ashes of a Buddhist saint or lama.

A traditional and often decorated, heap-formed cairn called an ovoo is made in Mongolia. It primarily serves religious purposes, and finds use in both Tengriist and Buddhist ceremonies. Ovoos were also often used as landmarks and meeting points in traditional nomadic Mongolian culture. Traditional ceremonies still take place at ovoos today, and in a survey conducted, 75 participants out of 144 participants stated that they believe in ovoo ceremonies. However, mining and other industrial operations today threaten the ovoos

In Hawaii, cairns, called by the Hawaiian word , are still being built today. Though in other cultures the cairns were typically used as trail markers and sometimes funerary sites, the ancient Hawaiians also used them as altars or security tower. The Hawaiian people are still building these cairns today, using them as the focal points for ceremonies honoring their ancestors and spirituality.

In South Korea cairns are quite prevalent, often found along roadsides and trails, up on mountain peaks, and adjacent to Buddhist temples. Hikers frequently add stones to existing cairns trying to get just one more on top of the pile, to bring good luck. This tradition has its roots in the worship of San-shin, or Mountain Spirit, so often still revered in Korean culture.

The Americas
Throughout what today are the continental United States and Canada, some Indigenous peoples of the Americas have built structures similar to cairns. In some cases these are general trail markers, and in other cases they mark game-driving "lanes", such as those leading to buffalo jumps.

The oldest of these structures are very old and pre-date contact with Europeans. They are iconic of the region (an  even features on the flag of the Canadian far-northeastern territory, Nunavut).

Cairns have been used throughout what is now Latin America, since pre-Columbian times, to mark trails. Even today, in the Andes of South America, the Quechuan peoples build cairns as part of their spiritual and religious traditions.

Modern cairns

Cairn can be used to mark hiking trails, especially in mountain regions at or above the tree line. Examples can be seen in the lava fields of Volcanoes National Park to mark several hikes. Placed at regular intervals, a series of cairns can be used to indicate a path across stony or barren terrain, even across glaciers. In Acadia National Park, in Maine, the trails are marked by a special type of cairn instituted in the 1890s by Waldron Bates and dubbed Bates cairns.

Sea cairns

Coastal cairns called sea marks are also common in the northern latitudes, especially in the island-strewn waters of Scandinavia and eastern Canada. They are placed along shores and on islands and islets. Usually painted white for improved offshore visibility, they serve as navigation aids. In Sweden they are called , in Finland , in Norway , and are indicated in navigation charts and maintained as part of the nautical marking system.

Other types
Chambered cairn
Clava cairn
Court cairn
Ring cairn
Unchambered long cairn
Clearance cairn

See also

 Boundary marker
 Crossroads (mythology)
 Dry stone
 
 
 Inuksuk
 Kerb (archaeology)
 Rock balancing
 
 
 Stele

References

External links

Notes on Building a Cairn (pdf), by Dave Goulder for the DSWA, Dry Stone Walling Association of Great Britain. Practical notes to help those embarking on a cairn-building project.

Artificial hills
Types of monuments and memorials
Stone buildings
Archaeology of death
Burial monuments and structures
Death customs
Hiking
Landscape history
Navigational aids